Gasker is a small uninhabited islet in the Outer Hebrides of Scotland,  southwest of Scarp, off the west coast of Harris.

The low-lying island has never been inhabited. In spite of its small size, it has several small pools of fresh water. It is principally noted for its large well-established seal colony. Residents of Scarp once visited Gasker regularly to kill seals for food.

There are two feasible landing spots for small craft: Geo Iar on the north side of Gasker, and Geodha Ear on the south side. A small unmanned lighthouse was built by the Northern Lighthouse Board in 1997.

 east-southeast lies the smaller islet of Gàisgeir Beag, and some surrounding rocks.

See also

 List of islands of Scotland

Footnotes

Bibliography
 
 

Islands off Lewis and Harris
Uninhabited islands of the Outer Hebrides
Harris, Outer Hebrides